Oleg Georgiyevich Kononov (born 23 March 1966) is a Russian football coach and a former player.

Playing career 
Oleg Kononov began his playing career in Russia at Iskra Smolensk in 1983.

He later moved to Belarus, where he would play for various clubs until 1999.

In 1998, he was named the Belarusian Premier LeaguePlayer of the year. Playing at KIM Vitebsk, he became the runner-up of the Belarusian Premier League.

Managing career

Sheriff Tiraspol 
The most glory Kononov attained as a coach, was while in charge of FC Sheriff Tiraspol. His team became the champions in Moldovan National Division three times (2004/05–2006/07), was the Moldavian Cup holder in 2006, and the Moldovan Super Cup in 2005.

Karpaty Lviv 
On 9 June 2008, Kononov was invited to take charge of Ukrainian Premier League club Karpaty Lviv following the resignation of Valery Yaremchenko. He brought a new style of play to the team, including the use of a 4-3-3 formation which emphasizes the flanks instead of the usual 4-4-2 formation. At the end of the 2008-09 season, Karpaty finished in the season in middle of the league at 9th place.
Kononov enjoyed more success the next season, guiding Karpaty to top 8 in the Ukrainian Cup where they were eliminated by eventual finalists Metalurh Donetsk. They also finished fifth in the league and therefore qualified for the 2010–11 UEFA Europa League, where after impressively passing Galatasaray in the playoff round, finished last in Group J with 1 point.

Krasnodar 
He took over the management of FC Krasnodar early in the 2013–14 Russian Premier League and led them to Europe for the first time in their history, finishing 5th in the league and qualifying for the 2014–15 UEFA Europa League. In 2014-15 season they defeated, among others, Real Sociedad in the Europa League qualifiers and advanced to the group stage. They did not qualify for the knockout phase. Midway through the 2014–15 Russian Premier League competition, they reached the 2nd spot in the standings. He resigned from his Krasnodar position on 13 September 2016.

Arsenal Tula 
He signed with FC Arsenal Tula on 1 June 2018.

Spartak Moscow 
He left Arsenal by mutual consent on 12 November 2018 and signed with FC Spartak Moscow until the end of the 2018–19 season. on 29 September 2019, he resigned from Spartak following 4 consecutive losses in a league that were preceded by a failure to qualify for the 2019–20 UEFA Europa League group stage.

Riga FC 
On 5 February 2020, he signed with the reigning Latvian champions Riga FC. The stint ended in late 2020.

Return to Arsenal Tula 
On 10 June 2022, Kononov was hired once again by Arsenal Tula, freshly relegated to the second-tier Russian Football National League. On 11 January 2023, he left the post of head coach, having played 20 matches in the current season of the First League, in which FC Arsenal Tula won nine victories and drew five times.

Honours
As coach
Sevastopol
Ukrainian First League (1): 2012-13

Krasnodar
Russian Football Premier League third place: 2014-15

References

External links
 

1966 births
Living people
Sportspeople from Kursk
Soviet footballers
Russian footballers
Belarusian footballers
Belarusian expatriate footballers
Expatriate footballers in Poland
FC Dnepr Mogilev players
FC Zorya Luhansk players
FC Vitebsk players
FC Lokomotiv Vitebsk (defunct) players
Ruch Chorzów players
FC Naftan Novopolotsk players
FC Torpedo Minsk players
FC Karpaty Lviv managers
FC Sevastopol managers
FC Spartak Moscow managers
FC Krasnodar managers
Ukrainian Premier League managers
Russian Premier League managers
Expatriate football managers in Ukraine
Russian football managers
Russian expatriate football managers
Russian expatriate sportspeople in Moldova
Russian expatriate sportspeople in Ukraine
Belarusian football managers
Belarusian expatriate football managers
Belarusian expatriate sportspeople in Ukraine
Belarusian expatriate sportspeople in Moldova
FC Akhmat Grozny managers
FC Arsenal Tula managers
Association football midfielders
FC Iskra Smolensk players